Lanzhou is a city in Gansu, China.

Lanzhou may also refer to:
Lan Prefecture, a historical prefecture in modern Shanxi, China
Chinese destroyer Lanzhou (170)